Agénor is both a masculine French given name and a surname. Notable people with the name include:

 Agénor Bardoux (1829–1897), French politician
 Agénor de Gasparin (1810–1871), French politician and writer
 Agénor Azéma de Montgravier (1805–1863), French archaeologist and soldier
 Ronald Agénor (born 1964), Haitian tennis player

References 

French masculine given names